The Gilgit-Baltistan Judicial Academy is an agency of the Government of Gilgit-Baltistan in Gilgit for legal training established in 2021. The Academy provides pre-service and in-service training to the judicial officers and court personnel. The management and administration of the Academy are run by the board under the leadership of the Chief Justice of Gilgit-Baltistan Chief Court and an appointed Director-General.

See also 
 Gilgit-Baltistan Chief Court
 Supreme Appellate Court Gilgit-Baltistan
 Federal Judicial Academy
 Khyber Pakhtunkhwa Judicial Academy
 Punjab Judicial Academy
 Balochistan Judicial Academy
 Sindh Judicial Academy

References

External links 
 Gilgit-Baltistan Chief Court

Legal organizations based in Pakistan
Judiciary of Gilgit-Baltistan
2021 establishments in Pakistan
Government agencies of Gilgit-Baltistan